Swarm drones are the indigenous drone machines that are capable of surveillance and of performing attack missions. Three Indian start-ups have won a three-year-long swarm drone competition organised by the Indian Air Force, which will now pave the way for at least two of them to get formal contracts for surveillance, attack and electronic warfare drones. The ‘swarm architecture’ award went to NewSpace Research & Technologies Pvt Ltd, run by former IAF officer Sameer Joshi. Incidentally, NewSpace had recently won a USD 15 million swarm drone order from the Indian Army.
The ‘communication architecture’ award went to a Delhi Technology University team incubated Flaire Unmanned Systems Pvt. Ltd.  in a tie-up with Adani Defence,later  and the ‘drone architecture’ award went to Dhaksha Unmanned Systems. For designing the swarm drones for the Indian Army, Hindustan Aeronautics Ltd. is supporting NewSpace research and Techologies in development of the swarm drones. 

At an event in Jhansi in November 2021, DRDO showcased the armed swarm technology with minimal human efforts. The Drones are operable at high-altitudes, rough-weather conditions and can fly at a speed of 100 km/hr and has ability to strike multiple drones at the target.

For promoting drone development, the Indian Air force also launched a three-year long competition in 2018, named, Mehar Baba Swarm Drone Competition that was open for distinct organizations. 

The use of swarm drones was also done by the Israeli Defence forces to find the rocket launchers situated in Gaza.

References 

Unmanned aerial vehicles
Robotics